Quebrada Sorocaima is a small river in the Mirandino sector of the city of Caracas, in Venezuela. Its waters flow through the municipality of Baruta in the state of Miranda.

It originates on the western slope of Cerro El Volcán, at 1150 m. It flows into the lower course of the Quebrada La Boyera, north of the entrance to the Teaching Medical Center La Trinidad (CMDLT).

References

Baruta Municipality
Rivers of Capital District (Venezuela)
Rivers of Miranda (state)